Toulouse is one of the principal cities of France.

Toulouse may also refer to:

Education 
 University of Toulouse
 Toulouse Graduate School, University of North Texas, Denton

Places 
 The Arrondissement of Toulouse, containing the city of Toulouse
 Toulouse–Blagnac Airport
 Gare de Toulouse-Matabiau, a railway station

History
 The Kingdom of Toulouse, a kingdom of Visigoths between the 5th and 8th centuries which had its capital at Toulouse

Music 
 Toulouse (EP), a 2014 EP by Benny Tipene
 "Toulouse" (song), a 2011 song by Nicky Romero

People 
 Henri de Toulouse-Lautrec (1864–1901), artist
 Stephen Toulouse (1972–2017), internet personality

Sports 
 Stade Toulousain, one of Europe's top rugby union clubs, often referred to as simply Toulouse
 Toulouse FC, the principal football club in Toulouse
 Toulouse Olympique, a rugby league club in Toulouse
 Toulouse FC (1937), a defunct football club

Animals 
 Toulouse goose, a breed of large, domesticated geese

See also
 Battle of Toulouse (disambiguation)